Schulstad is a Danish food manufacturer, known for its bakery products; it is the main manufacturer of Danish pastry in the UK.

History
The company was founded in 1880 in Denmark.

The company became part of a larger cooperative in 2003.

Structure
The company is headquartered in Denmark.

United Kingdom
In the UK, the company has its main site in north Buckinghamshire.

Products
It produces the three top-selling Danish pastry product types in the UK.

The Danish pastry industry is worth about £60m in the UK, around 69 million Danish pastries.

See also
 Aryzta

References

External links
 Schulstad Bakery Solutions

Bakeries of Denmark
Companies based in Milton Keynes
Food manufacturers of Denmark